Lucinda Green's Equestrian Challenge is a 2006 sports video game by Australian developer IR Gurus Interactive and published by Red Mile Entertainment for PlayStation 2 and Microsoft Windows. The game is named after Lucinda Green, a six-time Badminton Horse Trials winner, who also serves as in game mentor.

Reception 

IGN felt it offered a more professional experience than contemporary horse-related games, an deemed it an "off-beat, niche title" from the developer. JeuxVideo wrote that it " manages to strike a balance between its ambitions of pure simulation and its desire for accessibility to a wide audience". Lapresse notes that many horse themes titles were released throughout 2007. Jeuxactu felt it would carry players over until the next major release in the genre. Heise wrote that it was "quite unmistakably a computer game for girls". Meanwhile, PSM3 Magazine UK said "LGEC works, just, but there's really 'neigh' point in playing it".

References

External links 

2006 video games
Horse racing video games
Horse-related video games
PlayStation 2 games
Video games developed in Australia
Windows games
Transmission Games games